Neve may refer to:

Companies
 AMS Neve, a British audio design & engineering company
 Neve Electronics, one of the companies that formed AMS Neve
 Neve 8048/Neve 8078, hand-wired analogue mixing consoles manufactured by Neve Electronics

People

Given name
 Neve or Nieve, variant forms of the given name Niamh

Surname
 Edwin Neve (1885–1920), English footballer
 Margaret Ann Neve (1792–1903), first recorded female supercentenarian 
 Rupert Neve (1926–2021), electronics engineer and entrepreneur
 Suzanne Neve (born 1939), English actress

Places
 Neve (titular see), former Roman Catholic diocese in Arabia
 Neve, now called Nawa, Syria, a city in the Roman province of Arabia Petraea
Neve, a component of Hebrew placenames literally meaning "place of residence", "oasis"
 Neve Glacier, North Cascades National Park, Washington, U.S.
 Neve Peak, North Cascades National Park, Washington, U.S.

Other uses
 Névé, a type of snow associated with glacier formation
 Neve (American band), American pop rock group, 1997–2001
 Neve (British band), released a vocal version of Y-Traxx's Mystery Land

See also
 Neves (disambiguation)
 Neves (surname), a surname
 Nevus (plural "nevi"), a medical term encompassing moles, birthmarks, beauty marks, and other types of lesion